The following is a list of notable events and releases that happened in 2017 in music in South Korea.

Debuting and disbanded in 2017

Debuting groups

 14U
 A.C.E
 Adoy
 Be.A
 Busters
 Dreamcatcher
 Duetto
 Elris
 Favorite
 Golden Child
 Good Day
 GreatGuys
 HashTag
 Highlight
 Honeyst
 Hyeongseop X Euiwoong
 In2It
 IZ
 JBJ
 Kard
 Longguo & Shihyun
 Mind U
 MVP
 MXM
 Myteen
 NU'EST W
 ONF
 P.O.P
 Pristin
 Rainz
 Seven O'Clock
 S.I.S
 The Boyz
 The Rose
 Top Secret
 TRCNG
 Triple H
 Varsity
 Wanna One
 Weki Meki

Solo debuts

 Bibi
 DPR Live
 I
 I'll
 Jang Han-byul
 Jeong Se-woon 
 Jeon So-yeon
 Kang Si-ra
 Kevin Oh
 Kim Chung-ha
 Kim So-hee
 Kriesha Chu
 Lee Hae-ri
 Leellamarz
 Minzy
 One
 Punch
 Ravi
 Samuel 
 Seohyun
 Sojung
 Soyou
 Suzy
 Woo Won-jae
 Youngji

Disbanded groups

2AM
 2Eyes
 Beatwin
 Big Brain
 Blady
 Boys24
 Chocolat
 D.Holic
 High4
 History
 I.B.I
 I.O.I
 Infinite H
 Leessang
 Madtown
 M.I.B
 Miss A
 Onnine Ibalgwan
 Phantom
 Sistar
 Sistar19
 Spica
 T-ara QBS
 The Legend
 Two X
 Unicorn
 Wonder Girls

Releases in 2017

First quarter

January

February

March

Second quarter

April

May

June

Third quarter

July

August

September

Fourth quarter

October

November

December

Deaths
Jonghyun (aged 27), singer and songwriter (Shinee/SM the Ballad)

See also
2017 in South Korea
List of South Korean films of 2017
List of Gaon Album Chart number ones of 2017
List of Gaon Digital Chart number ones of 2017

Notes

References

 
South Korean music
K-pop